Best of Groove Coverage is a compilation album by the German Euro-trance band Groove Coverage, released in May 2005.

Track listing
 "Moonlight Shadow"
 "Poison"
 "God is a Girl"
 "Runaway"
 "7 Years and 50 Days"
 "The End"
 "She"
 "Moonlight Shadow"
 "Remember"
 "Million Tears"
 "Beat Just Goes"
 "Are U Ready"
 "Moonlight Shadow" (Warp Brothers remix)
 "Poison" (Friday Night Posse remix)
 "God Is A Girl" (Alex Konrad remix)
 "The End" (Special D remix)

References

External links
 

Groove Coverage albums
2005 compilation albums
2005 video albums